Vaijnath Mohiniraj Pundlik (23 December 1913 – 9 March 2009) was an Indian architect, considered an important figure of South Asian architecture and noted for his contributions to the evolution of architectural discourse in India. He is known for his contributions to the architecture of Indian Parliament at Delhi.

Early life
Vaijnath Mohiniraj Pundlik was born in Parli Vaijnath, India. His father was working in postal and telegram department. His father had a transferable job and had service at many places in Maharashtra. Vaijnath Mohiniraj Pundlik studied his schooling at Pandharpur and Parbhani. At that time, Parbhani was in Nizam territory. Learning of Urdu language was mandatory in the schools at Parbhani. He studied at Kalabhavan College and the J. J. School of Architecture, Mumbai. He completed {Intermediate Architect at Kalabhavan College and Advance Diploma at J. J. School of Architecture.

Career
He started his career at Suvarnapathaki and Sons as Draftsman in 1934. He migrated to Delhi and joined at "Delhi Improvements". Later he joined "Central Public Work Department" as senior draftsman in 1938. He has done number of architectures in Delhi during his service.

Works
 Architecture of Indian Parliament for the capacity for 500 from 148 on request of Ganesh Vasudev Mavlankar, the first Speaker of the Lok Sabha. This arrangement is still being used after 60 years.
 Ashok Statue near Rashtrapati Bhavan
 Central Excise department building
 Income tax office in Delhi
 Income tax offices at Bihar, Punjab, Kashmir, Madhya Pradesh, Bangal, Uttar Pradesh

Exercise and Parvati Hill Climbing
He had built his body during schooling and was climbing Parvati hill for more than 25 years everyday till the age of 93 from year 1973 after retirement from government service.

Awards and recognition
He was rewarded in Pune in 2003

Death
He died on 9 March 2009 at Pune

References

Artists from Pune
1913 births
2009 deaths
20th-century Indian architects